Ricardo Rojas Frías (born June 15, 1955) is a retired boxer from Cuba, who represented his native country at the 1980 Summer Olympics in Moscow, Soviet Union. There he won the bronze medal in the light heavyweight division (– 81 kg), after being defeated in the semifinals by eventual silver medalist Paweł Skrzecz of Poland.

1980 Olympic results
Round of 16: Defeated Ismail Salman (Iraq) by decision, 5-0
Quarterfinal: Defeated Michael Madsen (Denmark) by decision, 4-1
Semifinal: Lost to Pawel Skrzecz (Poland) by decision, 2-3 (was awarded bronze medal)

References
 databaseOlympics

1955 births
Living people
Light-heavyweight boxers
Boxers at the 1980 Summer Olympics
Olympic boxers of Cuba
Olympic bronze medalists for Cuba
Olympic medalists in boxing
Cuban male boxers
Medalists at the 1980 Summer Olympics